The N5 road is one of the national highways of Gabon. It is connects Kougouleu to Bibasse.

National highways in Gabon